Iota Capricorni (ι Cap, ι Capricorni) is a solitary, yellow-hued star in the southern constellation of Capricornus. It can be seen with the naked eye, having an apparent visual magnitude of +4.3. Based upon an annual parallax shift of 16.2 mas as seen from the Earth, the star is located about 201 light years from the Sun. At that distance, the visual magnitude of the star is diminished by an extinction factor of 0.08 due to interstellar dust.

This is an evolved G-type giant star with a stellar classification of G8 III. It is classified as a BY Draconis type variable star. The activity and photometric variation of the star allow an estimate of its rotation period as 68 days.

Iota Capricorni has an estimated 2.9 times the mass of the Sun and nearly 11 times the Solar radius. It is 390 million years old and is radiating 83 times the solar luminosity from its chromosphere at an effective temperature of 5,200 K.

Chinese name

Planetary system

In 2022, two exoplanets, both super-Jovian in mass, were discovered in orbit around Iota Capricorni using a combination of radial velocity and astrometry. The inner planet has a highly eccentric orbit.

References

BY Draconis variables
G-type giants
Capricorni, Iota
Capricornus (constellation)
Durchmusterung objects
Capricorni, 32
203387
105515
8167